Terrain to Roam is the second studio album by American rapper Subtitle. It was released on Alpha Pup Records on October 10, 2006.

Critical reception

Marisa Brown of AllMusic writes, "The album still has the general dark-hollow-drum feel of Young Dangerous Heart, but there's a playfulness heard here that was missing on his first release." She called it "a creative, interesting, and accessible album, an excellent piece of work from one of the underground's most exciting and unique artists." Meanwhile, Eddie Fleischer of Alternative Press gave the album a 2 out of 5, commenting that "It's hard to diss on a dude who's obviously putting his heart into his music, but unfortunately there just isn't enough here to really make a dent."

Track listing

References

External links
 

2006 albums
Subtitle (rapper) albums
Alpha Pup Records albums
Albums produced by Madlib
Albums produced by Daddy Kev
Albums produced by Thavius Beck